Spaces is the seventh studio album by Brazilian psychedelic rock band Violeta de Outono, released on October 14, 2016 through Voiceprint Records. The band began work on the album circa June 2016, but it wouldn't be officially announced until September 19, 2016, when they uploaded a short teaser on their official YouTube channel; later on, a lyric video for the track "A Painter of the Mind" was uploaded on October 5, 2016. The album is an homage of sorts to Swiss-German artist Paul Klee (1879–1940); it uses a sketch made by him as its cover art, and the lyrics to "A Painter of the Mind" consist of many excerpts of some of his poems.

The album also counts with a guest appearance by musician Fernando Alge, who wrote the track "Flowers on the Moon", and was mastered by Andy Jackson, who previously frequently collaborated with Pink Floyd.

Track listing

Personnel
 Fabio Golfetti – vocals, guitar, production
 José Luiz Dinola – drums
 Gabriel Costa – bass
 Fernando Cardoso – keyboards
 Fernando Alge – guitar, backing vocals (on track 5)
 Alex Angeloni – mixing, engineering
 Andy Jackson – mastering
 Invisível – cover art (on a sketch by Paul Klee)

References

2016 albums
Voiceprint Records albums
Violeta de Outono albums
Portuguese-language albums